Sidney Scot Lewis  (born May 30, 1964) is a former American football defensive back. He had played for the New York Jets of the National Football League (NFL) in 1987. He played college football at Penn State University.

References 

1964 births
Living people
People from Canton, Ohio
Players of American football from Ohio
American football defensive backs
Penn State Nittany Lions football players
New York Jets players